Shanghai Venture Capital Company ("SHVC") is one of China's largest state-owned venture capital/private equity firm. It is owned by the Shanghai municipal government.

Established in 1999, Shanghai Venture Capital Co. has been a dominant state-owned venture capital/private equity firm in China. SHVC was initially established with RMB¥ 600 million registered capital from the Shanghai municipal government.

Investments

As of 2013, Shanghai Venture Capital Co. has invested a total of RMB¥ 2.4 billion in over 160 private companies, and had 7 IPOs. SHVC currently has over 100 employees and more than 30% has international experience. SHVC currently has RMB¥ 10 billion under management.

Shanghai Venture Capital Co. specializes in early stage and growth stage investments in the following areas:

 Clean energy
 Energy-efficient technologies 
 Biomedical technologies
 New materials
 Information technologies

Shareholders and Partners

SHVC's main shareholders include National Development and Reform Commission(NDRC), State-owned Assets Supervision and Administration Commission(SASAC), Chinese Academy of Sciences(CAS) etc.

SHVC has developed long-term alliance with Temasek Holdings, Tsinghua Venture Capitals, Shanghai International Trust Co., Fudan University, Shanghai Jiao Tong University Industry Group, and many other strategic partners.

Related Parties
 National Development and Reform Commission
 State-owned Assets Supervision and Administration Commission
 Chinese Academy of Sciences
 Temasek Holdings
 Fudan University
 Shanghai Municipal Government

References 

Chinese companies established in 1999
Companies based in Shanghai
Private equity and venture capital investors
Private equity firms of China
Venture capital firms of China
Government-owned companies of China